The Queen and I is a 2018 British TV film comedy drama directed by Dan Zeff, based on a 1992 novel/play of the same name written by Sue Townsend, adapted as a Christmas special on Sky One, released on Christmas Eve.

Cast
Samantha Bond as Queen Elizabeth II
Oliver Chris as Prince Charles
Amanda Abbington as Princess Anne
Julia McKenzie as Queen Elizabeth The Queen Mother
Frances Barber as Princess Margaret
David Walliams as Jack Barker
Noah Bailey as Prince Harry
Johnny Vegas as Spiggy
 Woody Melbourne as Prince William
Ellen Thomas as Philomena
Kathryn Drysdale as Trish Welling
Bronwyn James as WPC Ludlow

References

External links

The Queen and I, Comedy.co.uk
Review, The List

2018 television films
British comedy-drama television films
2010s English-language films
Films set in England
Films based on British novels
Television shows based on British novels
Films about Elizabeth II
2018 films
Films shot in Greater Manchester
2010s British films
2018 comedy-drama films